Pabst Blue Ribbon Bouts, later The Wednesday Night Fights, is a television program that broadcast boxing matches from New York's Madison Square Garden featuring Russ Hodges, Jack Drees, and Bill Nimmo. It finished at #26 for the 1950-1951 season in the Nielsen ratings, followed by #17 in 1951-1952, #14 in 1952-1953, #23 in 1953-1954 and #25 in 1954-1955. After its cancellation on CBS, the series was picked up by ABC, renamed The Wednesday Night Fights, and continued until 1960.

Kinescopes of some of these matches were later re-broadcast under the title Blue Ribbon Classics. In recent years, ESPN Classic has aired some of  the bouts. Most Pabst Blue Ribbon fights can be viewed at TVS Classic Sports Network.Com.

During the 1954-55 season, this show was pre-empted every fourth week by The Best of Broadway, which ran a total of nine episodes for the season.

References

External links
Pabst Blue Ribbon Bouts at IMDB

Boxing television series
CBS Sports
CBS original programming
1948 American television series debuts
1955 American television series endings
Pabst Brewing Company